Three Weeks in Paris is a 1925 silent movie from Warner Bros. starring Matt Moore and Dorothy Devore. No copies are known to survive.

Cast
Matt Moore as Oswald Bates
Dorothy Devore as Mary Brown
Willard Louis as Gus Billikins
Helen Lynch as Dolly Withers

References

External links
 
  Three Weeks in Paris

1925 films
American silent feature films
Lost American films
Warner Bros. films
1926 comedy films
1926 films
Silent American comedy films
American black-and-white films
1925 comedy films
1920s lost films
1920s American films